Aeromonas simiae is a Gram-negative, oxidase- and catalase-positive motile bacterium of the genus Aeromonas, with a polar flagellum, isolated from the faeces of a healthy monkey (Macaca fascicularis).

References

External links
Type strain of Aeromonas simiae at BacDive -  the Bacterial Diversity Metadatabase

Aeromonadales
Bacteria described in 2004